The East African Railway Master Plan is a proposal for rejuvenating the railways serving Tanzania, Kenya, and Uganda and adding railways to serve Rwanda and Burundi. The objective is to further the economic development of eastern Africa by increasing the efficiency and speed, and lowering the cost, of transporting cargo between major ports on the Indian Ocean coast and the interior.

All new railways will be standard-gauge, and existing narrow-gauge railways will be rehabilitated. The plan accounts for break of gauge issues and aims for a good interoperability within the resulting hybrid railway network. A later step would expand the eastern Africa railway network to South Sudan, Ethiopia, and the Democratic Republic of the Congo (DR Congo). The plan is managed by infrastructure ministers from participating East African Community countries in association with transport consultation firm CPCS Transcom Limited.

New railways
The members of the Northern Corridor Integration Project (NCIP) have agreed to build all of their railways to the Chinese National Railway Class 1 standard. The Central Corridor / Dar es Salaam-Isaka-Kigali/Keza-Musongati Railway Project countries (Tanzania, Rwanda, and Burundi) have selected the Chinese Class 2 standard and/or the American Railway Engineering and Maintenance-of-Way Association standard.

New railways between and within the core countries of the Master Plan

New railway links from Master Plan core countries to other countries

In addition to the railways mentioned above, there are ideas for new standard-gauge railway lines under the plan. They are by definition international lines between Master Plan countries and third countries. But the table in the following also contains domestic railway lines within third countries, as it is possible to connect to these railways through railways featured by the Master Plan.

Existing railways

The Eastern African Railway Master Plan is not only taking new standard-gauge railways under the Master Plan into account, but also existing colonial era narrow-gauge railways, including Lake Victoria train ferries and pre-existing standard-gauge railways. It is planned to "rehabilitate" and to use some of the existing narrow-gauge railways in addition to the new standard-gauge railways as to provide additional routes for cargo transports. For the break of gauge handling between the different railway gauges, see below. Only railways relatively close to the new railway network are shown in the table.

Break of gauge handling and passenger transfer

The combination of railways with different track gauges into a hybrid railway network requires measures to make the different railways interoperable despite the break of gauge problem. In East Africa, this applies to the new standard-gauge railway network and to the old and eventually rehabilitated narrow-gauge railway network. Two methods exist within the East African Railway Master Plan countries for break of gauge handling and passenger transfers.

Break of gauge handling of cargo always needs to consider the much lower axle loads and different loading gauges on the narrow-gauge railway network. Therefore, the East African Railway Master Plan considers the new standard-gauge railways to become the backbone of the whole hybrid railway network, with narrow-gauge railways assuming the role of branch lines.

Break of gauge handling is usually done in dedicated break of gauge railway stations. The only existing break of gauge railway station within the reaches of the East African Railway Master Plan is the break of gauge transshipment station at Kidatu in Tanzania, which uses cranes for the transshipment of goods, especially containers, between the TAZARA Railway network and the Tanzania Railways Ltd. network. New break of gauge handling stations are to be constructed between the standard-gauge railway backbone and eventually rehabilitated narrow-gauge branch lines. As of September 2018, no actively planned break of gauge railway stations are in consideration.

Another method is to build a railway station of the standard-gauge railway in the immediate vicinity to an old railway station of the narrow-gauge railway network – which then allows passenger transfers between both railway stations. There is only one example for that as of September 2018. The Nairobi Terminus railway station of the new Mombasa–Nairobi Standard Gauge Railway is located in the southern Nairobi suburb of Syokimau just opposite of the Syokimau Terminus of the Nairobi rail service, a narrow-gauge commuter rail service linking Syokimau with Nairobi Central Station and the Nairobi Central Business District.

See also
 Cape to Cairo Railway
 Northern Corridor Transit and Transport Coordination Authority
 North–South Corridor Project
 Rail transport in Ethiopia
 Rail transport in Kenya
 Rail transport in Rwanda
 Rwanda Standard Gauge Railway
 Rail transport in South Sudan
 Rail transport in Tanzania
 Rift Valley Railways Consortium
 Transport in Burundi

External links
 Northern Corridor Integration Projects
 Dar es Salaam-Isaka-Kigali/Keza-Musongati Railway Project
 Map Showing the Proposed Railway Lines (Northern Corridor)
 Burundi Map | Rwanda Map | Tanzania Map | Kenya Map | Uganda Map

References 

Rail transport in East Africa
East African Community